The 1953 Baylor Bears football team represented Baylor University in the 1953 college football season. They finished with a 7-3 record in the Southwest Conference for the year. Tackle James Ray Smith was selected as an All American player; Cotton Davidson (Quarterback), Jerry Coody (Halfback) and  Smith were all selected All-Southwest Conference players.

Schedule

References

Baylor
Baylor Bears football seasons
Baylor Bears football